Jaroslava Valentová (born 11 December 1945) is a Czech athlete. She competed in the women's high jump at the 1968 Summer Olympics.

References

1945 births
Living people
Athletes (track and field) at the 1968 Summer Olympics
Czech female high jumpers
Olympic athletes of Czechoslovakia
Athletes from Prague